Turkmenicampa mirabilis is a species of small, white, bristle-tailed arthropod in the order Diplura. It is found from Lebap Region in Turkmenistan.

References

Diplura
Monotypic arthropod genera